Geoff Bell is an English actor. He is most notable for his performances in Green Street, The Business, Kingsman: The Secret Service, Suffragette,  War Horse and King Arthur. Geoff has won awards for his own directorial debut with his short film, "Bacon" which he also wrote and produced.

Career
He has appeared in many films, mostly as a cameo appearance or as a supporting role.  Among them are Girl with a Pearl Earring, Stardust, The Long Firm, Making Waves, The Business and RocknRolla.

He played the captain of England's football team, Gary Wackett, known as Wacko, an extremely violent centre back, a parody of Stuart Pearce, in the film Mike Bassett: England Manager.

In War Horse he had a cameo role as Sgt. Sam Perkins in the British Army, who briefly looks after the horses Joey and Topthorn at the start of the film.

One of his best known films is Green Street, where he appeared as Tommy Hatcher, the rival of the main characters.

In 2008, Bell starred in the UK film Freebird, directed by Jon Ivay. Appearing alongside Gary Stretch and Phil Daniels, the film followed three bikers across a drug fuelled ride in the Welsh countryside.

He appeared in Tormented, as the sports teacher, which was released on 22 May 2009 in the UK, alongside Alex Pettyfer, April Pearson and Calvin Dean and he has appeared in a supporting role in Wild Target as Dixon's assistant, alongside Rupert Grint, Bill Nighy and Martin Freeman.

In spring 2010 Bell appeared in Five Daughters as DC Roy Lambert in the drama about the five prostitutes murdered in Ipswich, Suffolk.

In 2011, Bell appeared in Channel 4's four part drama series Top Boy.

In 2012, Bell played John Morgan in Comes a Bright Day.

In 2019, Bell played Jack Verhoeven in the television adaptation of the novel series His Dark Materials by Philip Pullman.

Personal life
He lives in Deal, Kent. Bell is a supporter of Millwall F.C.

Filmography

Mike Bassett: England Manager (2001) - Gary Wackett
Mean Machine (2001) - Officer Ratchett
AKA (2002) - Brian Page
I'll Sleep When I'm Dead (2003) - Arnie Ryan
Girl with a Pearl Earring (2003) - Paul The Butcher
Oh Marbella! (2003) - Stan
Green Street (2005) - Tommy Hatcher
The Business (2005) - Sammy
Scoop (2006) - Strombel's Co-Workers
Stardust (2007) - Receptionist
Botched (2007) - Boris
The Seeker (2007) - Security Guard #1
Freebird (2008) - Tyg
Love Me Still (2008) - Bobby
Daylight Robbery (2008) - Alex
RocknRolla (2008) - Fred the Head
Night Train (2009) - Detective
Tormented (2009) - Gordon Ramsey
Solomon Kane (2009) - Beard
The Reeds (2010) - Croker
The Heavy (2010) - Frank Marshall
Wild Target (2010) - Fabian
Route Irish (2010) - Alex Walker
Brighton Rock (2010) - Kite
Mercenaries (2011) - Vladko
Big Fat Gypsy Gangster (2011)- Geoff
War Horse (2011) - Sgt. Sam Perkins
Top Boy (2012) - Bobby Raikes
Comes A Bright Day (2012) - Mr. Morgan
Treasure Island (2012) - Israel Hands
Boys on Film 8: Cruel Britannia (2012) - Frank (segment "Man and Boy")
Storage 24 (2012) - Bob
Comedown (2012)- The Tenant
Dementamania (2013) - David Snodgrass
Film Coolio - 'C.O.O.L.I.O' Change Original Ordinary Lives Interface Oracle (2014) - Chaney
The Great Fire (2014, TV Mini-Series) - Wilson
Kingsman: The Secret Service (2015) - Dean
North v South (2015) - Bill Vincent
Suffragette (2015)- Norman Taylor
Mine (2016) - Mike's Father
The Level (2016, TV Series) - Duncan Elliot
Rogue One (2016) - 2nd Lieutenant Frobb
The Man with the Iron Heart (2017) - Muller
King Arthur (2017) - Mischief John
The End of the F***ing World (2017, TV Series) - Martin
Tin Star (2017, TV Series) - Malcolm
Once Upon a Time in London (2018) - Darky Mulley
His Dark Materials (2019, TV Series) - Jack Verhoeven
''Don't Let It Break Your Heart by Louis Tomlinson music video

References

External links

English male film actors
English male television actors
Living people
Male actors from London
21st-century English male actors
20th-century English male actors